Crimmins Island is one of the many uninhabited Canadian Arctic islands in the Qikiqtaaluk Region, Nunavut. It is a Baffin Island offshore island located in Frobisher Bay, southeast of the capital city of Iqaluit.

Other islands in the immediate vicinity include Algerine Island, Alligator Island, Aubrey Island, Cairn Island, Coffin Island, Emerick Island, Frobisher's Farthest, Gardiner Island, Jenvey Island, Kudlago Island, Mair Island, McLaren Island, Mitchell Island, Monument Island, Pichit Island, Pink Lady Island, Ptarmigan Island, Sale Island, Sybil Island, and Thompson Island.

References 

Uninhabited islands of Qikiqtaaluk Region
Islands of Baffin Island
Islands of Frobisher Bay